Gandhol is a village and former non-salute  princely state on Saurashtra peninsula in Gujarat, western India.

History 
The petty princely state, prant, was ruled by  Chieftains. In 1901 it comprised a single village, with a population of 137, yielding 2,000 Rupees state revenue (1903-4, mostly from land), paying 111 Rupees tribute, to the Bhavnagar

References

Sources and external links 
 Imperial Gazetteer, on DSAL.UChicago.edu - Kathiawar

Princely states of Gujarat
Rajput princely states